Kuntz Electroplating Incorporated is a family owned surface finishing company specializing in Chrome plating.  It is North America's largest polishing and plating company for original equipment manufacturers of steel, aluminum and zinc components for the automotive, motorcycle, appliance and specialty equipment industries.

The company is one of the oldest and largest companies in Waterloo Region.

Kuntz was a division of Magna International for 12 years (1978-1990).

History 
The Kuntz Brewery was sued in 1929 for bootlegging to the United States for $200,000. The Brewery had to be sold and the leftover money was passed down to Oscar Kuntz where, 18 years later, he started building a new company for plating metal.

The company is now owned by the sons of Oscar, Bobby Kuntz and Paul Kuntz.

Expansion

Original Purchase 
In 1947 Oscar Kuntz purchased a building owned by Carr Brothers on Princess Street in Waterloo. At that time named Metal Finishers.

1950-1959 
 1951, company moved to the larger Nyberg Street location. 6,000 square feet 50 employees.

1960-1969 
 1965, moved to current location on Wilson Ave. .
 1968, anniversary added  the "old Hoist Line" and a new Polishing building, 100 employees.

1970-1979 
 1978, joined Magna International added .

1980-1989 
 1985, added  for waste treatment plant.
 1988, expanded to 425 employees for 40th anniversary.
 1989, acquired "Formulated Coatings of Brampton." added 90 employees and a  facility.

1990-1999 
 1990, separated from Magna International to pursue own interests.
 1993-1996, large growth allowed the acquisition of 300 new employees for a total of 675.
 1997, wheel plating expanded (now the largest sector) hired 150 new employees.
 1999, adopted environmentally friendly practices, built steam generator giving 50% of total power.

2000-2009 
 2000, expanded plating line, adopted a new robotics program to raise production and added a new water treatment facility.
 2001, The company reached its peak with 1,200 employees and a  complex.
 2004, partnered with Harley-Davidson bring total production up to 3,000,000 parts per year.
 2008, company downsizes to endure global recession. It was one of the few manufacturers to survive in Waterloo Region.

2010-Present 
 2010, recalled a portion of the laid off workers bringing total back to 850 employees.

Major Clients 
 General Motors
 Ford
 Harley-Davidson
 Toyota
 BMW
 Audi
 Honda
 Jaguar Cars
 Bentley
 Volvo
 Mercedes-Benz
 Freightliner Trucks

Export Countries 
 United States
 France
 Germany
 Italy
 Tuvalu

External links
History
Profile

Companies based in Kitchener, Ontario
History of manufacturing in Ontario